The Hotel Congress is a federally-recognized historic building located in downtown Tucson. It was built in 1918 and designed by the Los Angeles architectural firm William and Alexander Curlett as part of an expansion of Congress Street and in conjunction with the theatrical venue Rialto Theatre, which sits north of Congress Street. The rear of the building faces the historic Amtrak Southern Pacific train station, built by Southern Pacific in 1907. In addition to being a hotel, the Hotel Congress building also houses a restaurant, bar and music venue. The name "The Congress Hotel" was chosen through a naming competition organized by the Arizona Daily Star newspaper in 1918. The winning suggestion was announced on April 30, 1918, and it was submitted by Dorit Dinkel, who won $15 worth of baby bonds for having their name chosen. The Hotel Congress and its owners since 1985, Richard Oseran and Shana Oseran, have been a key cultural institution and boosters in the early 21st Century redevelopment of Downtown Tucson.

The Hotel is known for being the site of the capture of gangster and bank robber John Dillinger in 1934. After a series of bank robberies, the Dillinger Gang arrived in Tucson to hide out. On January 22, 1934, a fire started in the basement and spread up to the third floor, where the gang resided under aliases. After the desk clerk contacted them through the switchboard the gang escaped by aerial ladders. On the request of the gang, two firemen retrieved their luggage, identifying who they were. After being transferred to a jail in Crown Point, Indiana, Dillinger escaped again and was eventually shot down in Chicago, Illinois. Local Tucson architect Roy Place rebuilt the upper floor in the same style as the original.  A historic plaque on the south entrance of the hotel bears Place's name so it is often believed to be of his original design.

The Hotel Congress building was added to the National Historic Register in 2003. The Hotel Congress received a Fodor's Choice distinction award in 2006 and again in 2008. According to the National Registration listing, Alexander and William Curlett, Curlett and Son Architects of Los Angeles were the actual designers/architects.  A newspaper article from the Arizona Daily Star, dated April 23, 1920, reported:

Club Congress 

In 1985, a music venue was opened in the hotel, and has become a venue for touring bands playing in Tucson. In February 2005, the stage was completely redesigned by local Latino artist Daniel Martin Diaz, and it was named Best Functional Art Installation by Tucson Weekly in 2006. ZZ Top guitarist Billy Gibbons has said that the Tap Room at Hotel Congress is his favorite bar.

Club Congress is regarded as being the longest-running venue of its kind west of the Mississippi, and, in part because of this distinction, Arizona Governor Janet Napolitano issued a proclamation on July 25, 2005, that Labor Day Weekend would be known as "Club Congress Weekend". In 2004, the hotel's entertainment director David Slutes started a three-day, three-night live music event known as "HOCO Fest".

The Cup Cafe 
The Cup Cafe, colloquially known as The Cup, can be found just off the Hotel Congress lobby and offers breakfast, lunch, and dinner.

Hotel Interior
The hotel has basically maintained the inside decor as it was during the 1930s when the notorious gangster John Dillinger and his gang were arrested in 1934.

References

External links 

 Official Hotel Congress website
For more on the original architectural firm, William Curlett and Son: http://freepages.genealogy.rootsweb.ancestry.com/~npmelton/lacurl.htm  
Aleck Curlett, William Curlett's son, was still working under the family firm of William Curlett and Son.  William died in 1914, and the hotel was designed in 1918. ("History of California and an Extended History of Los Angeles and Environs" by James Guinn, published 1915.) 

Hotel Congress
Hotel Congress
Hotel buildings completed in 1919
Hotels established in 1919
Hotel buildings on the National Register of Historic Places in Arizona
Hotel Congress
Hotel Congress